Postplatyptilia fuscicornis is a moth of the family Pterophoridae. It is known from Brazil, Chile, Colombia, Ecuador and Uruguay.

Adults are on wing in February.

References

fuscicornis
Moths described in 1877